The 2nd World Championship Victory Race, formally the John Player Challenge Trophy, was a motor race, run to Formula One rules, held on 22 October 1972 at Brands Hatch, Kent. The race was run over 40 laps of the circuit. Jean-Pierre Beltoise won in his BRM P180. The entry included several Formula 5000 cars.

Qualifying
Note: a blue background indicates a Formula 5000 entrant.

† Holland's car was qualified by Brian Redman.

Race

References

External links
 Race results at www.silhouet.com 

World Championship Victory Race
Formula 5000 race reports